The 1972–73 season was the 93rd season of competitive football in England.

Honours

Notes = Number in parentheses is the times that club has won that honour. * indicates new record for competition

Football League

The Football League announced that a three-up, three-down system would operate between the top three divisions from the following season, rather than the traditional two-up, two-down system. The four-up, four-down system between the Third and Fourth Divisions would continue, as would the re-election system between the league's bottom four clubs.

First Division
Liverpool won the championship (their first in 7 years) in Bill Shankly's penultimate season as manager despite competition from Arsenal, Leeds United, Ipswich Town and Wolverhampton Wanderers. Arsenal actually led by a point with six matches to play, but a dismal 1-3-2 record down the stretch cost them the title.

Manchester United sacked manager Frank O'Farrell after 18 months in charge, following a terrible first half of the season which left them in serious danger of relegation only five years after their European Cup victory. Tommy Docherty, the 44-year-old Scottish national coach and former Aston Villa manager, was appointed as his successor, and steered them to survival. Neighbours Manchester City had a similarly poor campaign and were nearly relegated only a year after narrowly missing out on the title, but recovered well to finish safely in mid-table after manager Malcolm Allison was replaced by Johnny Hart late in the season.

West Bromwich Albion were relegated to Division Two for the first time since 1949, ultimately being left to rue losing five games in a row at the end of the season; winning just two of those games would have seen them survive. Crystal Palace, who had spent the previous few years battling against the odds on a limited budget, finally succumbed to relegation.

Second Division
Burnley and Queens Park Rangers won promotion to the First Division. Huddersfield Town's decline continued as they slid into the Third Division, where they were joined by Brighton & Hove Albion.

Third Division
Bolton Wanderers and Notts County occupied the two promotion places in the Third Division. Rotherham United, Brentford, Swansea City and Scunthorpe United were relegated to the Fourth Division.

Fourth Division
Hereford United were promoted from the Fourth Division in their first season as a Football League club. They had been elected to the Football League a year earlier after finishing as runners-up to Chelmsford City in the Southern League and achieving a shock win over Newcastle United in the FA Cup. They were joined in the promotion zone by champions Southport, Cambridge United and Aldershot. Newport County missed promotion only on goal average. There were no arrivals or departures in the league for 1973.

Top goalscorers

First Division
Pop Robson (West Ham United) – 28 goals

Second Division
Don Givens (Queens Park Rangers) – 23 goals

Third Division
Arthur Horsfield (Charlton Athletic) – 26 goals

Fourth Division
Fred Binney (Exeter City) – 27 goals

FA Cup

An Ian Porterfield goal saw Sunderland achieve a famous 1–0 win over Leeds United in the FA Cup final. Sunderland's team, managed by Bob Stokoe, did not contain any full internationals, whereas Don Revie's Leeds side were all internationals. Sunderland goalkeeper Jim Montgomery also received plaudits after a good performance featuring a noted double-save from Trevor Cherry and Peter Lorimer.

Wolverhampton Wanderers beat Arsenal 3–1 at Highbury in a third-place playoff, held three months after the final.

League Cup
Tottenham Hotspur's Bill Nicholson guided his club to a League Cup triumph, beating Norwich City 1–0 in the final, and in the process added another trophy to the club's ever-growing list of honours.

European Football
Derby County lost to the eventual finals runner-up Juventus by an aggregate score of 3–1 in the semifinals of the European Cup. Leeds United lost a controversial European Cup Winners Cup Final against AC Milan.

Star players 
Tottenham Hotspur goalkeeper Pat Jennings was voted FWA Footballer of the Year to add to his League Cup winners medal.

Star managers 
Bill Shankly guided Liverpool to another league championship triumph.
Bob Stokoe helped Sunderland achieve a shock win against Leeds United in the FA Cup final.
Bill Nicholson added the League Cup to his list of trophies won as Tottenham manager.
Don Revie took Leeds to 3rd in the league and led them to the finals of the FA Cup and Cup Winners' Cup.
Brian Clough took his Derby County side to the semi-finals of European Cup, losing to Juventus.

References